Inking may refer to:

Inking (attack), act of throwing ink on other person
Inking, a defensive activity of certain cephalopods and sea hares
Inking (comic book production)
Pen computing, a computer input method using a stylus
A real-time computer graphics technique of outlining the edges of a model

See also
Ink (disambiguation)